North Deer Island is an island and wildlife sanctuary located in Hitchcock, Texas, in western Galveston Bay, about halfway between Galveston Island and Tiki Island in the U.S. state of Texas. The  natural island is one of the few natural islands remaining in West Galveston Bay. It is an important waterbird nesting site on the Upper Texas Coast and studies have shown that up to 40,000 pairs of birds nest on the island each year.

Restoration projects
In 2009, a consortium of public and private partners, including the Houston Audubon Society and the Harris & Eliza Kempner Fund, were awarded the Coastal America Partnership Award for recognition of their financial support in the creation of a breakwater to help slow erosion to the island.  The partnership also helped fund restoration of wetlands that encompass the island. The award is only environmental honor of its kind given by the president of the United States.

References

External links
Texas Parks and Wildlife
Houston Audubon Society

Galveston, Texas
Islands of Galveston County, Texas
Islands of Texas
Nature reserves in Texas
Protected areas of Galveston County, Texas
Uninhabited islands of the United States
Wildlife sanctuaries of the United States